Arthur Robison (June 25, 1883 – October 20, 1935) was a German film director and screenwriter of the silent era. He directed 20 films between 1916 and 1935.

Selected filmography
 A Night of Horror (1916)
 What Belongs to Darkness (1922)
 Between Evening and Morning (1923)
 Schatten – Eine nächtliche Halluzination (1923)
 Peter the Pirate (1925)
 Manon Lescaut (1926)
 The Last Waltz (1927)
 Looping the Loop (1928)
 The Informer (1929)
 Count Woronzeff (1934)
 Make Me Happy (1935)
 The Student of Prague (1935)

References

External links

1883 births
1935 deaths
German film directors
Writers from Chicago
American male screenwriters
Screenwriters from Illinois
Silent film screenwriters
20th-century American male writers
20th-century American screenwriters